A&C Mall  is a privately owned business that provides a set standard for mixed use retail shopping centres in Ghana. It is located in Greater Accra Region,  Ghana at  East Legon, Jungle Road after the American International School.

Facilities
A&C Mall evolved into a mixed use centre after the appointment of Broll Property Management in 2010. The mall comprises retail, offices, services, and a university. It has 30,000 square metres of mixed used space with parking for over 500 cars. A&C Mall accommodates 63 businesses of which 50% are operated by Ghanaian businesses. A&C Mall is anchored by Maxmart a supermarket chain, Lancaster University a UK franchise and international NGOs.

References

Shopping malls in Ghana
Greater Accra Region